The following highways are numbered 416:

Canada
 Manitoba Provincial Road 416
 Newfoundland and Labrador Route 416
 Highway 416 (Ontario)

Costa Rica
 National Route 416

Japan
 Japan National Route 416

United States
 Florida:
  Florida State Road 416
  County Road 416 (Pinellas County, Florida)
  Louisiana Highway 416
  Maryland Route 416 (former)
  New York State Route 416
  Ohio State Route 416
  Pennsylvania Route 416
  Puerto Rico Highway 416
  Tennessee State Route 416
  Texas State Highway Loop 416 (former)